Paul Huehnergard is a former Canadian pairs figure skater with partner Susan Huehnergard. He is the 1965 and 1966 national champion.

Results
(with Huehnergard)

References
skatabase

Navigation

Canadian male pair skaters
Living people
Year of birth missing (living people)